Barzegar is a surname of Persian origin. 
Notable people with the surname include:
Kayhan Barzegar (born 1968), Iranian political scientist 
Majid Barzegar (born 1973), Iranian film director, producer, screenwriter, and photographer
Mansour Barzegar (born 1947), Iranian wrestler 
Mohammad Barzegar (born 1976), Iranian football player

See also
 Mazraeh-ye Barzegar, A village in Iran

Arabic-language surnames